Topór (Polish for "axe") is a Polish coat of arms. It was used by several szlachta (noble) families in medieval Poland and under the Polish–Lithuanian Commonwealth.

History
The topór coat of arms is said to be one of the oldest Polish szlachta emblems, if not the oldest. Its use dates back to at least as far as a seal of the late 13th century. Before the Union of Horodło (1413) approximately 220 Polish szlachta families - mostly in and around Kraków, Lublin and Sandomierz - used this symbol.

Under the Union the coat of arms was represented by Maciej z Wąsosza, the Voivod of Kraków, and by Jan Butrym, a Lithuanian boyar who represented  Lithuanian noble family. After the Union of Horodło the coat of arms Topor was transported to Lithuania, adopted by Jan Butrym in Lithuania.  Due to its antiquity it was sometimes referred to as "Starża", an Old-Polish word denoting great age.

Blazon
Gules, axe argent. The crest is in the form of an axe embedded in the helm, argent.

In Latin: (Topor). Thopor siue Bipennis alba in campo rubeo (...)

Notable bearers
Notable bearers of this coat of arms have included:
Family of Okulicz 
Jan Jerzy Grabowski
Cyprian Norwid
House of Ossoliński
Jerzy Ossoliński
Franciszek Maksymilian Ossoliński 
Anna Teresa Ossolińska 
Józef Kajetan Ossoliński 
Jan Zbigniew Ossoliński 
Krzysztof Ossoliński
House of Starza Szolayski
Adam Prince Starza Szolayski
Wanda Princess Starza Szolayska
Gerda Starza Szolayska
Szołajski
House of Tęczyński
 Zbigniew Tęczyński
 Jan Magnus Tęczyński
House of Tarło
Teofilia Tarło 
Zygmunt Tarło 
Jan Tarło 
Andrzej Tarło 
Pawel Tarło 
Jadwiga Tarło 
Stanisław Tarło 
Jan Karol Tarło 
Barbara Tarło
Eustachy Trepka
Józef Zabiełło
House of Bogdanowicz
Family of Zemła and Zemło ennobled 1413 in the Union of Horodło for taking part and courageous fighting in the battle of Grunwald 1410.
House of Matuszewski
Szymon Piotr Stefan Matuszewski

Gallery
Aristocratic variations

Standard variations

Coat of arms of cities and gminas

Coat of arms with the topór symbol

Paintings with the coat of arms topór

Other

See also
 Polish heraldry
 Heraldic family
 List of Polish nobility coats of arms

Bibliography
 Kasper Niesiecki: Herbarz polski. T. 9. 1839-1846
 Franciszek Piekosiński: Heraldyka polska wieków średnich. Kraków: Akademia Umiejętności, 1899
 Józef Szymański: Herbarz średniowiecznego rycerstwa polskiego. Warszawa: PWN, 1993
 Bartosz Paprocki, Jan Kazimierz Turowski: Herby rycerstwa polskiego przez Bartosza Paprockiego zebrane i wydane r. p. 1584. Kraków: Wydawnictwo Biblioteki Polskiej, 1858.
 Stanisław Teodor Chrząński: Tablice odmian herbowych. Juliusz Karol Ostrowski, 1909, s. V.
 Tadeusz Gajl: Herbarz polski od średniowiecza do XX wieku : ponad 4500 herbów szlacheckich 37 tysięcy nazwisk 55 tysięcy rodów. L&L, 2007, s. 363. .
 Barbara Trelińska: Album armorum nobilium Regni Poloniae XV - XVIII saec. Herby nobilitacji i indygenatów XV - XVIII w.. Lublin: 2001,
 Stanisław Dziadulewicz: Herbarz rodzin tatarskich w Polsce. Wilno: Stanisław Dziadulewicz, 1929

References

External links 
  
  

Polish coats of arms